Fadi Faisal Elhusseini (Arabic: فادي الحسيني) is a Palestinian-Canadian diplomat and writer, who is born in 1975. His research focuses on Turkey, the Palestinian cause, the Middle East and the Arab Spring.

Early life 
Fadi Elhusseini is a political and media expert, Board Member of the Institute for Middle East Studies in Canada. He served as the Director of the Bureau of Palestinian Minister of Foreign Affairs, and previously was the Executive Director of the Palestinian Council on Foreign Relations. In addition, he worked as a lecturer at Al-Azhar University in Gaza. He administrated an office of a project funded by the United States Agency for International Development.

Elhusseini presented several television programs on Palestine TV and worked as a columnist for a London-based news agency. He made contributions and wrote articles for a number of Arab and Western newspapers, magazines and journals dealing with issues such as the Palestinian conflict, politics and international relations in the Middle East and the Arab Spring. He contributed with one chapter in a book on Turkish-Canadian relations. Moreover, his articles were published in newspapers in Turkey, Norway, France, the United Kingdom, Canada, the United States, Russia, Belgium, South Africa, Pakistan, Indonesia, Egypt, Jordan, Lebanon, Iraq, Iran and Palestine. His works have been published in English, French, Italian and Arabic, and many of his articles and publications have been translated into Turkish, Persian and Russian.

He gave lectures on the Palestinian-Israeli conflict and developments in the Middle East, and participated in many academic conferences in Poland, the UK, Italy, the US and Canada. He completed a number of specialized training courses in negotiations, diplomacy, international relations, media, arbitration and strategic planning. Additionally, he speaks a number of foreign languages.

He received his Ph.D. in international relations from the University of Sunderland, the UK. He also earned his master's degree in international trade law and policy in Italy and received his bachelor's degree in economics and political science in Egypt.

Background and Education 
Fadi Faisal Hamdi Abdulrahman Ahmed Mohiuddin Elhusseini was born on 21 October 1975 in Gaza. His father, Faisal Elhusseini, is one of the most prominent lawyers in Palestine, who had been arrested twice by Israeli authorities. And his grandfather, Hamdi Elhusseini, is one of the most famous Palestinian intellectuals.

He earned a bachelor's degree in economics and political science from the Faculty of Economics and Political Science - Cairo University. In 2000, he received a master's degree with honors from the University of Salento (formerly called: Università degli Studi di Lecce) in Italy. In October 2012, he began his Ph.D. studies at the University of Sunderland, the UK. His thesis deals with the role of Turkey in the Arab world in the aftermath of the so-called Arab Spring.

Career 
He began his diplomatic career working at the Palestinian Ministry of Planning and International Cooperation in 1998. He also taught economic development at Al-Azhar University in Gaza, and worked as a columnist for The Upcoming, a London-based news agency. He was the Executive Director of the Palestinian Council on Foreign Relations (chaired by Ziad Abu Amr). He worked as a political and media advisor for the Embassy of Palestine in Turkey,Egypt, and Canada. In 2013, he began working as an Associate Research Fellow at the Institute for Middle Eastern Studies, Canada, and soon he became board member of the same institute. Currently, he is heading the Palestinian embassy in Hungary.

He has many papers, studies and articles published in many Arab and Western newspapers. Elhusseini published parodical articles in many newspapers and international magazines such as East and Mediterranean Affairs in Italy, Today's Zaman, Uluslararası Politika Akademisi – (UPA), Journal of Turkish Weekly, Tuck magazine and Canadian Global Affairs Institute – Canada, Middle East Monitor – the UK, Al-Ahram Weekly and Daily News Egypt – Egypt, Jol Press, Contrelign and Politique Actu – France; Iran Review – Iran, PakTribune – Pakistan, Oslo Times – Norway, News 24 – South Africa, Eurasia Review, Arabian Gazette – the United Arab Emirates, Jakarta Post – Indonesia, Al-Quds newspaper, Pal-Think and Arabic Media Internet Network (AMIN) – Palestine, Washington Institute and Foreign Policy Association – the US, IRIA – China, Democratic Arab Center – Germany and Russian International Affairs Council – Russia. He completed specialized courses in diplomacy, international relations, negotiations, arbitration, conflict management, information skills, spokesperson skills, strategic planning, feasibility studies, etc. He also presented television shows on Palestine TV.

Articles 

 The New Taste of September – 6 September 2001
 Abbasid Power and Hamas Governance – 17 April 2006
 Their Siege and Our Unity – 12 May 2006
 The Flood and the Muslim Brotherhood – 10 June 2006
 The Land of Blood the Barbaric Media – 15 June 2006
 Tear of a Fighter – 23 July 2006
 Are These the Times of the Knights? – 2 August 2006
 The Lebanese War: Lessons Learned – 12 August 2006
 Let's Always Bet on Ourselves – 20 November 2006
 Let's First Understand the Consequences – 6 December 2006
 Unique is the Palestinian Political System – 24 December 2006
 Mecca Blast – 27 March 2007
 Major Shifts and Great Challenges – 12 April 2007
 Lawlessness of Democracy – 8 May 2007
 What's Next!! – 4 August 2007
 We Need to Decide, Now – 16 August 2007
 The Struggle with Illusions in Talks of Peace – 5 November 2007
 The Jewish State vs. The Right of Return – 17 November 2007
 The State of Promises – 3 December 2007
 The Choice Is Yours, Palestine – 7 March 2008
 The Extreme Heat of Winter – 14 March 2008
 Beyond Negotiations – 12 April 2008
 Sixty Years of Eternity – 13 May 2008
 Discussion, Negotiations, Appeasement and Disengagement – 19 July 2008
 The Loss of a Nation and the Dying Cause – 30 August 2008
 How Do They Determine Their Destiny? – 16 January 2012
 The Palestinian Choice – 20 January 2012
 The Israeli Concept of Safety and Security: Between Strengthening the Blockade and Building the Wall – May 2012
 The Art of Palestinian Resistance – 27 November 2012
 Israel's Airstrike on Syria – 2 February 2013
 Will Israel Attack Iran? – 8 March 2013
 A New Spring: The Middle East Between the History of Revolutions and Nation's Future – 14 April 2013
 The New Arab Revolutions: A Conspiracy Theory or The Will of a Nation? – 15 May 2013
 The Middle East is Dying
 Will Erdogan Visit Gaza?
 Hidden Conflicts in the Events in the Arab Region
 The Syria Strike: The Mask Falling
 Arab Countries: A New Regional Order Has Just Emerged
 ISIS's Ambitions: Between the Permitted and the Ordained
 The Middle East: Stars Fall and Powers Rise
 Hamas's Diplomatic Activity: Strategies Changing and Building New Alliances
 Has Everyone Lost Their Way?
 Even If He Wants To, Can Netanyahu Make Peace?
 The Syrian Tunnel: Chaos to Hijack the Arab Spring or to Scatter the Leaves?
 Protective Edge: A Military Tool for Political Purposes
 The Palestinian Reconciliation: Regional Dimensions and International Implications
 Israel: Between the Illusory Peace Talk and the Dangers of Virtual Presence

Research Papers and Other Publications 

 A research on economic development and environmental degradation.
 A research on investment laws in Egypt.
 A research paper on fostering the role of Palestinian communities abroad.
 A research paper on the history of Arab revolutions and geopolitical future.
 A policy paper on Turkish-Canadian relations.
 A research paper on democracy in the Arab world.
 A research paper on the Arab Spring, its causes and mechanisms.
 A policy paper on Turkish foreign policy towards the Arab world.
 A research paper on World War I, the Ottoman Empire and the Middle East.
 A research paper on the future of European role in the Arab world following the Arab spring.

References 

Palestinian journalists
Palestinian diplomats
Canadian journalists
21st-century Palestinian historians
1975 births
Living people